
Gmina Maciejowice is a rural gmina (administrative district) in Garwolin County, Masovian Voivodeship, in east-central Poland.

Villages
Gmina Maciejowice contains the villages and settlements of Antoniówka Świerżowska, Antoniówka Wilczkowska, Bączki, Budy Podłęskie, Domaszew, Domaszew-Młyn, Kawęczyn, Kępa Podwierzbiańska, Kobylnica, Kobylnica-Kolonia, Kochów, Kochów-Kępa, Kraski Dolne, Kraski Górne, Leonów, Maciejowice, Malamówka, Nowe Kraski, Oblin, Oblin-Grądki, Oblin-Korczunek, Oronne, Ostrów, Pasternik, Podłęż, Podoblin, Podstolice, Podwierzbie, Podzamcze, Pogorzelec, Polik, Przewóz, Samogoszcz, Strych, Szkółki Krępskie, Topolin, Tyrzyn, Uchacze, Wróble-Wargocin and Zakręty.

Neighbouring gminas
Gmina Maciejowice is bordered by the gminas of Kozienice, Łaskarzew, Magnuszew, Sobolew, Stężyca, Trojanów and Wilga.

References
Polish official population figures 2006

Maciejowice
Garwolin County